Zenopolis or Zenoupolis or Zenonopolis (Ζηνωνόπολις, "city of Zeno) is a name given to at least three cities of the Roman Empire in Late Antiquity:

 Zenopolis (Isauria), near present-day Elmayurdu, Turkey
 Zenopolis (Lycia), Turkey
 Zenopolis (Phoenicia), near present-day Damascus, Syria